Tone is the debut solo album of American rock bassist and Pearl Jam-member Jeff Ament, released September 16, 2008, on Monkeywrench Records. 3,000 copies of the album were pressed and distributed through independent record stores across the United States, as well as through Pearl Jam's official website. The album has also been made available as a digital download via Pearl Jam's official website for US$4.99.

Background
The album contains ten songs written over a span of 12 years. It features a raw, experimental sound and was recorded by Ament over an eight-year period at Horseback Court in Blue Mountain, Montana, which is Ament's home studio, and completed in 2008. Tone was mixed by Brett Eliason, who had previously worked with Ament as Pearl Jam's sound engineer. Its cover art was created by Ament.

Former Three Fish drummer and frequent Ament collaborator Richard Stuverud contributed his drumming to seven songs on the album, and King's X frontman Doug Pinnick contributed lead vocals to the song "Doubting Thomasina". Pinnick would later in 2010 feature as the lead singer of another Ament/Stuverud project, Tres Mts. "The Forest" was recorded by Pearl Jam; however, vocalist Eddie Vedder never got around to adding vocals to the track. The instrumental version by Pearl Jam is featured in the 2007 Pearl Jam concert film, Immagine in Cornice. The version of the song on Tone features vocals by Ament and music taken from the original demo version of the song.

Track listing

Personnel
Jeff Ament – all instruments (unless otherwise noted), additional recording, artwork

Additional musicians and production
Matt Bayles, John Burton – additional recording
Brett Eliason – recording, mixing
Joe Gastwirt – mastering
Doug Pinnick – vocals on "Doubting Thomasina"
Richard Stuverud – drums, background vocals

References

External links
Download at pearljam.com

2008 debut albums
Jeff Ament albums
Albums produced by Jeff Ament
Monkeywrench Records albums